First Tuesday may refer to:

 First Tuesday - a monthly NBC newsmagazine television program (1969 to 1973) first hosted by Sander Vanocur
 First Tuesday (documentary strand) - a monthly British current affairs television documentary strand
 First Tuesday (networking forum) - a London-based networking forum
 First Tuesday Book Club - an Australian book discussion television programme

See also
Election Day (United States), often but not always held on the first Tuesday of November